Lars Amund Vaage was born in 1952 at Sunde, Kvinnherad on the west coast of Norway, and studied classical piano at the Bergen Music Conservatory. He made his literary debut in 1979 with the novel Exercise Cold Winter, and has since published award-winning novels, short stories and collections of poetry, and a long essay on the art of storytelling, Sorrow and Song, 2016. In 1995 he had a definitive breakthrough in Norway with the Critics’ Prize-winning novel Rubato. In 2012, his acclaimed novel Sing, based on his experience of being the parent of a severely autistic child, was a national bestseller, winning the national Brage Prize and nominated for the Critics’ Prize. It has since become a classic.

“The one to whom I write this cannot read.” That is the opening sentence of Sing. It is also the key to the way this established novelist needs to find in order to tell his life-changing story, which for many years and many different reasons he did not think would be possible. In Sorrow and Song he expands on this decisive moment and sheds light on other insights into the art of writing, such as the relevance of music and rhythm in prose, and how fiction offers a certain freedom of speech which confessional literature does not.

His latest book The Little Pianist (2017) is a collection of short stories about love, longing and the lack of love. The children and adults here are looking for a language of their own, something that will connect them to others and provide some kind of redemption. They face great challenges. Art seems to offer the hope of insight and understanding, but its gatekeepers can be implacable; and how do you find love, and live with it, if you have never known it at home? If you venture to leave home, you may discover on your return that you have become a stranger to yourself and those who first knew you.

His work has been translated into English, German, Swedish, Russian, Polish and Hindi.

He was the festival writer with Bergen International Festival in 2001, and Dei nynorske festspela (The New Norwegian Festival) in 2008.

Vaage is the grandson of the Norwegian author Ragnvald Vaage (1889–1963).

Bibliography

Øvelse Kald vinter (Exercise Cold Winter) - novel (1979)
Fager kveldsol smiler (The Fair Evening Sun Smiles) - novel (1982)
Kyr (Cows) - short stories - (1983)
Dra meg opp (Pull Me Up)- novel (1985)
Baronen (The Baron) – play (1987)
Begynnelsen (The Beginning) - novel (1989)
Guten med den mjuke magen (The Boy with the Soft Tummy) - children’s book (1990)
Oklahoma - novel (1992)
Rubato - novel (1995)
Den framande byen (The Strange City) – a novel about Wilhelm Reich (1999)
Guten og den vesle mannen (The Boy and the Little Man) - children’s book (2000)
Det andre rommet (The Other Room) - poetry (2001)
Kunsten å gå (The Art of Walking) - novel (2002)
Tangentane (The Piano Keys) - novel (2005)
Utanfor institusjonen (Outside the Institution) - poetry (2006)
Skuggen og dronninga (The Shadow and the Queen) – novel (2010)
Den stumme (The Mute) – poetry (2011)
Syngja (Sing) – novel (2012)
Den raude staden (The Red Place) – poetry (2014)
Sorg og song (Sorrow and Song) – essay (2016)
Den vesle pianisten (The Little Pianist) – short stories (2017)

Awards
Sokneprest Alfred Andersson-Ryssts fond 1990
Norsk Forfattersentrums pris 1993
Samlagsprisen 1993
Aschehoug Prize 1995
Norwegian Critics Prize for Literature 1995, for Rubato
Nynorsk litteraturpris 1995, for Rubato
Dobloug Prize 1997
Oktoberprisen 1999
Gyldendalprisen 2002
P2-lytternes romanpris 2002, for Kunsten å gå
Emmausprisen 2005, for Tangentane
Melsomprisen 2011, for Skuggen og dronninga (The Shadow and the Queen)
Nynorsk litteraturpris 2012, for Syngja (Sing)
Brageprisen 2012, for Syngja (Sing)

References

External links 
Vaage’s Norwegian publisher’s page: http://oktober.no/Forfattere/Norske/Vaage-Lars-Amund

Vaage’s agency: Oslo Literary Agency: http://osloliteraryagency.no

In English, see https://www.shearsman.com/poetry-book-translations-perez-to-yang

http://www.longhousepoetry.com/translations.html

1952 births
Living people
People from Kvinnherad
Nynorsk-language writers
20th-century Norwegian novelists
21st-century Norwegian novelists
Norwegian Critics Prize for Literature winners
Dobloug Prize winners